Thacher Island is a small island off Cape Ann on the Massachusetts coast in the United States. It is a part of the Town of Rockport. It was a place where some naval confrontations, both minor and major, took place, which helped secure a victory for the colonists.

History

The island, named after Anthony Thacher, is located in perilous waters, where there have been many shipwrecks.  With the large number of shipwrecks around this area, there was a petition sent from sea captains to erect a light on the island.  On April 22, 1771, the provincial government authorized construction of two lighthouses on the island.  The lights went on December 21, 1771.

Although these lights were valuable assistance for the fishermen and sailors of the sea, there was a strong feeling among the townspeople that the lighthouse was helping the British fleet more than it was helping the Patriot cause.  This feeling increased after hostilities erupted with the Battles of Lexington and Concord and the Battle of Bunker Hill.  Early in July 1775, Dr. Samuel Rogers of Gloucester led his company of minutemen to the island.  There they destroyed the lights, and brought the keeper, one Captain Kirkwood, his family, and his assistants back to the mainland.

Both lights were rebuilt and lit in 1861.

In 1967, Joseph Barboza spent a notable period on Thacher Island as part of the Witness Protection Program.

The Thacher Island National Wildlife Refuge occupies the northern part of the island.

Film 
A film adaptation of Casey Sherman's 2013 bestselling book "Animal" was announced in August 2018, with the title Thacher Island. It is being developed by Fox 2000 and produced by Berlanti Productions. The writing team behind the film BlacKkKlansman, David Rabinowitz and Charlie Wachtel, has been hired to pen the adaptation.

The film will tell the story of notorious Boston hitman Joe Barboza, who agreed to testify against the New England mob in 1967, becoming the first person in American history to be put into a witness protection program. As part of the program, Barboza and his family were transported to Thacher Island, where they would be stationed under the protection of US marshals until the date of the trial.

Notes

References

Captains Courageous, Rudyard Kipling

External links
Thacher Island Association
Thacher Island Twin Lights on New England Lighthouses: A Virtual Guide

Islands of Massachusetts
Islands of Essex County, Massachusetts
Rockport, Massachusetts
Coastal islands of Massachusetts